This is a list of airports in Romania, grouped by type and sorted by location.



Airports 

Airport names shown in bold indicate the airport has scheduled service on commercial airlines.

Defunct
The Galați Airport is a defunct airport in Romania that operated in the city of Galați from 1926 to 1958.

Traffic

See also 
 List of airports by ICAO code: L#LR – Romania
 List of the busiest airports in Romania
 Aviation in Romania
 Romanian Air Force
 Transport in Romania
 Wikipedia:WikiProject Aviation/Airline destination lists: Europe#Romania

References 

Romanian Airports Association 
Romanian Civil Aeronautical Authority 
Romanian Air Force

External links 
 Lists of airports in Romania:
 Great Circle Mapper
 FallingRain.com
 Aircraft Charter World
 The Airport Guide
 World Aero Data
 A-Z World Airports

 
Airports
Romania
Airports
Romania